The 2021 Campeonato Baiano (officially the Campeonato Baiano de Futebol Profissional Série “A” – Edição 2021) was the 117th edition of Bahia's top professional football league. The competition began on 17 February and ended on 23 May. Bahia were the defending champions but they were eliminated in the semi-finals. 

The finals were played between Atlético de Alagoinhas and Bahia de Feira. This was the first season of the Campeonato Baiano with the finals played between two teams from outside of Salvador. Atlético de Alagoinhas won 5–4 on aggregate obtaining the first title. As champions, Atlético de Alagoinhas qualified for the 2022 Copa do Brasil and the 2022 Copa do Nordeste.

Format
In the first stage, each team played the other nine teams in a single round-robin tournament. Top four teams advanced to the semi-finals. The team with the lowest number of points was relegated to the 2022 Campeonato Baiano Série B. The final stage was played on a home-and-away two-legged basis with the best overall performance team hosting the second leg. If tied on aggregate, the penalty shoot-out would be used to determine the winners.

Champions qualified for the 2022 Copa do Brasil and 2022 Copa do Nordeste, while runners-up and third place qualified for the 2022 Copa do Brasil. Top three teams not already qualified for 2022 Série A, Série B or Série C qualified for 2022 Campeonato Brasileiro Série D.

Participating teams

First stage

Final stage

Semi-finals

|}

Group 2

Atlético de Alagoinhas qualified for the finals.

Group 3

Bahia de Feira qualified for the finals.

Finals

|}

Group 4

General table

Top goalscorers

References 

Campeonato Baiano